Killing Boy is a rock band of Japan.

History 
In 2010, ART-SCHOOL's Kinoshitariki was formed by former members of Hinata Hidekazu. At 31 December in the same year, COUNTDOWN JAPAN 10/11 MOON STAGE do the first live.

March 2011, "Killing Boy" that have its own label named "VeryApe Records" was released as first album.

Members 
 Kinoshitariki (Guitar, Vocal, Synthesizer)
 Hinata Hidekazu (Base, Synthesizer) - Straightener, Nothing's Carved in Stone works as a bassist.

Regular support 
 Shinichi Ito (Guitar) - Original guitarist of SPARTA LOCALS and HINTO.
 Okita Takashi Tadashi (Drum) - Hinata enrolled in the drummer of Nothing's Carved in Stone.
Okita and Ito is participating in both live and recording.

Discography

Album 
 Killing Boy (9 March 2011, 39th Oricon)
 Destroying Beauty (6 June 2012, 34th Oricon)

References

External links 
killing Boy『Destroying beauty』 - bounce インタビュー 2012年06月06日

Japanese rock music groups